The Vaslui trolleybus system was a small one route trolleybus network in the Romanian city of Vaslui.

The network opened on 1 May 1994. It was operated by a fleet of five Rocar trolleybuses. It closed on 7 July 2009. Construction on a depot commenced, but was never finished with buses being serviced on the street.

In August 2016, the 6.5 kilometre line reopened with the help of a European Union grant. Three Gräf & Stift trolleybuses were purchased from Salzburg.

References

Vaslui
Vaslui
1994 establishments in Romania
Vaslui